VSM-1 (Russian: ВСМ-1—Вертолетная Система Минирования-1) is a Soviet helicopter-based remote mining system. It can be mounted on various variants of the Mil Mi-8 helicopter, particularly the Mi-8T and Mi-8MT. It is capable of deploying a range of high explosive and fragmentation mines.

The system was developed by the State Research Engineering Institute (ГНИИИ) and was manufactured by the Kazan Helicopter Production Association, which was renamed to Kazan Helicopters in 1993. It is still being produced and used today by the Russian Armed Forces.

Action 
The VSM-1 system is made up of 4 containers, a PUM-1V (Russian: ПУМ-1В) control panel, a PKPI-1 (Russian: ПКПИ-1) control device, a PP-1V (Russian: ПП-1В) electronics test panel and a container lifting & suspension system.

Depending on the configuration, a Mi-8 equipped with VSM-1 can spray from 116 to 8352 mines in under a minute. This allows the creation of minefields with a density ranging from one mine per 5-6 squared meters to several mines per meter, depending on the helicopter's altitude.

Use 

Generally, the helicopter crew performs the mining from an altitude of 30-150 meters, at speeds of 150-220 km/h. Depending on the type of mines loaded in the system, VSM-1 allows the mining of areas of 400-2000 meters in length, with a width of 15-60 meters. The mines are commonly used in tandem with bombing runs, preventing the enemy from properly navigating the ruins, resulting in more effective mine use.

Specifications 

 Container size: 1884x410x630 mm
 Weight:
 Loaded container: 
 Empty container: 
 Control panel: 

 Minefield sizes (up to):
 Anti-tank: 
 Anti-personnel: 
 Anti-amphibious: 
 Temperature range of use: 
 Average density of the minefield:
 High explosive: 3-5 pcs/m
 Fragmentation: 0.2-0.3 pcs/m

Combat Use 
The VSM-1, along with other minelaying systems like the BMR-2 (Russian: БМР-2), saw extensive use in the Soviet Invasion of Afghanistan. As a result, more than a million mines were dispensed across the territory of Afghanistan.

Raid in Jalalabad 
The mission was carried out in December 1981 and involved mining trails and passes on the border of Afghanistan with Pakistan. It was carried by two Mi-8MT helicopters of the 335th OBVP (from Rus. Otdelʹnyy Boevoy Vertolëtnyy Polk) helicopter combat regiment, escorted by two Mi-24B attack helicopters. However, the mission was led by a senior navigator of the Air Force of the 40th Army, who arrived from Kabul, and was unfamiliar with the area. He guided the helicopter's crew over the border with Pakistan and ordered the mines to be dropped there, essentially mining the territory of Pakistan. The helicopter crew realized their mistake as soon as they saw railroads, which were not present in Afghanistan at that time.

Operators

Former Operators

See also 

 PFM-1
 Soviet Invasion of Afghanistan
 Organization for Mine Clearance and Afghan Rehabilitation
 PMN mine
 PTM-3 mine

Notes 

Land mines of the Soviet Union
Military equipment introduced in the 1980s